"Tomorrow Tomorrow" is a song by the Bee Gees written by Barry and Maurice Gibb. The song was originally intended to be recorded by Joe Cocker.  It was the first Bee Gees single released after Robin Gibb had quit the group which was now down to a trio featuring Barry Gibb, Maurice Gibb, and drummer Colin Petersen.

Origin
Originally, the song was written for Joe Cocker, but the group ultimately released it themselves. Barry rushed the track through, but it never reached Joe, who was given 'Delta Lady' by his management instead".

This song was recorded on 19 and 21 March 1969. Its B-side "Sun In My Morning" was also recorded on March 19.

Release
Released in the United States on 1 June 1969, the single charted only reached No. 54 on Billboard, but cracked the Top 40 on Cash Box, reaching No. 32. It achieved top ten placings in Brazil, New Zealand and some European countries, even topping the chart in Denmark, but in the brothers' native Britain peaked only at No. 23. The promotional video featuring, Barry, Maurice and Colin performing the song in a park is very rare. The band's manager, Robert Stigwood, made the decision to release the song as a single. Maurice later revealed, "We've got another one that we'll put straight out if it doesn't make it". The song was felt by both brothers to be more suited to Joe Cocker's singing style than their own. Barry said "This was a mistake that Robert [Stigwood] very rarely made" while Maurice remarked, "I don't think it's us but I quite like it".

Since neither song appeared on the next Bee Gees' album Cucumber Castle, no stereo mixes were produced until 1990 when they appear on the Bee Gees box set Tales from the Brothers Gibb. Barry can be heard counting the band in at the start of the stereo mix.

The original single mix made its CD debut on the 1980s reissue of Best of Bee Gees where it replaced Spicks and Specks which had been left off the CD for contractual reasons. It had previously appeared on the 1976 budget compilation Massachusetts which had largely consisted of B-sides and non-album tracks.

Cash Box commented on the fact that the song goes through "several musically-exciting changes."

Personnel
 Barry Gibb – lead vocals, rhythm guitar
 Maurice Gibb – backing vocals, bass guitar, piano, rhythm guitar
 Colin Petersen – drums
 Robert Stigwood – record producer
 Bill Shepherd – orchestral arrangement, violins

Charts

Weekly charts

Year-end charts

References

External links
Promotional video of "Tomorrow Tomorrow"

1969 singles
Bee Gees songs
Songs written by Barry Gibb
Songs written by Maurice Gibb
Song recordings produced by Robert Stigwood
Song recordings produced by Barry Gibb
Song recordings produced by Maurice Gibb
1969 songs
Number-one singles in Denmark